Brij Raj Singh is an Indian politician and was a member of 6th Lok Sabha.  He left education for participating in the youth rally of Netaji Subhas Bose in the year 1941 and joined Indian National Congress. He remained with Indian National Congress till 1957 then joined Bharatiya Jana Sangh in 1962. He was elected to 6th Lok Sabha from Anola as a member of Hindu Mahasabha and again 6th Lok Sabha as a member of Bharatiya Lok Dal  from  Anola.

References

1924 births
Year of death missing
India MPs 1977–1979
Janata Party politicians
Indian National Congress politicians
Bharatiya Jana Sangh politicians
Bharatiya Lok Dal politicians
Hindu Mahasabha politicians
People from Bareilly district
Lok Sabha members from Uttar Pradesh